Dominic Littlewood (born 29 March 1965), known as Dom Littlewood, is a British journalist and television presenter who specialises in consumer protection. He is best known for his roles with BBC and Channel 5, presenting programmes such as Fake Britain, Cowboy Builders, Saints and Scroungers and Don't Get Done, Get Dom.

Early life and work
Littlewood was born on 29 March 1965 in Southend-on-Sea, Essex. He is one of four children of an air traffic controller father and teacher mother; despite his parents' second jobs, the family were not wealthy, but with his parents' encouragement Littlewood's early entrepreneurial endeavours were successful, buying his first flat in Westcliff-on-Sea, Essex aged 20. His first job was as part of an on-board team repairing Thames sailing barges; when the company relocated from Maldon, Essex to France, he started a City and Guilds apprenticeship in motor engineering.

Dom is diabetic, having been diagnosed with Type 1 Diabetes as a child.

Television career
Littlewood was first seen on TV as a contestant on the BBC dating show The Other Half. In 2001, Littlewood, at the time in charge of Network Cars in Leigh, Southend-on-Sea, Essex, appeared on Faking It, helping Somerset vicar Nigel Done succeed as a car salesman.

In 2005 Littlewood presented a show called Beat the Burglar to protect homeowners. He employed the services of an ex-burglar who highlighted people's homes to show their lack of security and show them how it feels to have your home ransacked and personal possessions stolen. Dominic watched the break-in on a monitor along with the homeowners and at the end of the show he arranged for experts to come in and rectify all of the security flaws pointed out by the ex-con.

In 2007, Littlewood took part in the BBC One's Strictly Come Dancing. Since 2010, he has co-presented Cowboy Builders on Channel 5. His most notable episode was based around a student house in Headingley, Leeds, where Dominic Stewart's house was completed to a shoddy standard. From 2010 to 2012, he presented Fake Britain on the BBC, but was replaced by Matt Allwright: he returned to the show in 2017. In 2012, Littlewood presented the Postcode Lottery draws on Channel 5. Beginning on 27 January 2015, Littlewood hosted a three-part series on ITV called Bad Builders: Bang to Rights. Since 2016 he has presented Dom on the Spot on BBC One. He has appeared in other television shows including To Buy or Not to Buy, Holiday and The One Show.

In 2020, Littlewood appeared as a contestant on Celebrity Masterchef.

Other work
Littlewood contributes to the Top Gear Magazine and has written pieces for the Motoring section of The Daily Telegraph. Dominic is also an expert on used Nissan Qashqais and Jukes, and can frequently be found on Twitter advising would-be owners what to look out for in order to avoid any unwanted “lemons”.

Filmography
Television

References

1965 births
Living people
English television presenters
People from Southend-on-Sea
People with type 1 diabetes